The 1978 Florida State Seminoles football team represented Florida State University in the 1978 NCAA Division I-A football season. The team was coached by Bobby Bowden and played their home games at Doak Campbell Stadium.

Schedule

Personnel

Season summary

at Syracuse

Oklahoma State

at Miami (FL)

Houston

Cincinnati

at Mississippi State

at Pittsburgh

at Southern Mississippi

Virginia Tech

Navy

ABC Players of the Game: Jimmy Jordan & Sam Platt (off), Ron Simmons (def) 10 tackles, FR, FF

Florida

References

Florida State
Florida State Seminoles football seasons
Florida State Seminoles football